The following is a timeline of the history of the city of Brisbane, Queensland, Australia.

18th century

1770 Captain James Cook sails up Queensland coast with botanist Joseph Banks; names Cape Moreton, Point Lookout and Glass House Mountains. Takes possession of eastern Australia, naming it New South Wales.
1799 Captain Matthew Flinders explores Moreton and Hervey bays; names Red Cliff Point (now Clontarf Point) but the name Redcliffe is used by a nearby town, Pumice-stone River (now Pumicestone Passage). Also lands on Coochiemudlo Island.

19th century

1823 Emancipated convicts John Finnegan, Richard Parsons, and Thomas Pamphlett were shipwrecked off Moreton Island while looking for timber (a fourth person, John Thomson, died at sea). Following a quarrel, Parsons continues north while others stay on the island.
1823 Surveyor-general John Oxley arrives at Bribie Island to evaluate Moreton Bay as a site for penal settlement. Discovers Finnegan and Pamphlett who guide him to the Brisbane River; names Peel Island, Pine River and Deception Bay.
1824 Oxley discovers Parsons and returns him to Sydney
1824 First commandant Lt. Henry Miller arrives at Red Cliffe Pt from Sydney with soldiers, a storekeeper and their families, John Oxley, botanist Allan Cunningham, stock and seeds.
1824 First settler born in colony named Amity Moreton Thompson
1825 Shipping channel via South Passage found; settlement moves to Brisbane River; first convict buildings built along William St.
1825 Edmund Lockyer of 57th Regiment explores Brisbane River. Notes flood debris 100 feet above river levels at Mount Crosby, finds first coal deposits. Names Redbank after soil colour.
1826 Captain Patrick Logan takes over as commandant of colony. Achieves extensive stone building program using convict labour. Discovers Southport bar and Logan River.
1827 Patrick Logan establishes arable land near the settlement on the Brisbane River at New Farm to feed to growing colony
1827 Allan Cunningham leaves Hunter Region to seek link via New England Tableland to Darling Downs
1827 Indigenous resistance leader "Napoleon" exiled to St Helena Island. Aborigines raid maize plots, resist advances. Frequent conflict until the 1840s.
1828 Cunningham discovers gap in Great Dividing Range, providing access from Moreton Bay to Darling Downs. Also explores Esk-Lockyer basin and upper Brisbane Valley in 1829
1829 Moreton Bay Aborigines seriously affected by smallpox
1830 Captain Logan mysteriously murdered near Esk, commemorated in folk song, "The Convict's Lament"
1831 Moreton Bay settlement population reaches 1241, including 1066 convicts
1833 Ship Stirling Castle wrecked on Swain Reef; first of many ships to wreck on Queensland coast over next 40 years.
1836 Quaker missionaries report Moreton Bay indigenous population infected with venereal disease from American whalers
1837 Brisbane's pioneering Petrie family arrives in Moreton Bay. Andrew Petrie (builder and stonemason) is clerk of government works; stays on with wife Mary and five children after penal settlement closes. Son John Petrie becomes Brisbane's first mayor; other son Tom writes sympathetically about local indigenous people.
1839 Calls to cease convict transportation successful; Moreton Bay is closed as a penal settlement. 2062 men and 150 women served sentences at the settlement, half of them being Irish; 10 percent died, 700 fled, 98 never recaptured.
1840 Escaped convict John Baker surrenders after 14 years of living with indigenous Australians
1841 Indigenous people Merridio and Neugavil are executed at Wickham Terrace windmill for the murder of surveyor Stapylton and his assistant in Logan
1842 New South Wales Governor George Gipps proclaims Moreton Bay a free settlement. Land is offered for sale from Sydney.
1842-1855 War of Southern Queensland
1846 Squatter and entrepreneur Evan Mackenzie succeeds in making Brisbane a port independent from Sydney
1846 Recorded population of Moreton Bay area is 4000 Aborigines and 2257 migrants
1848 First 240 government-assisted British migrants arrive in Brisbane. First Chinese labourers arrive.
1849 Rev Dr J.D. Lang, local clergyman and journalist, brings his first English, Irish, Welsh and Scottish migrants with unauthorised promise of land grants. Government rations issued to prevent starvation. Lang envisages a colony of self-sufficient, thrifty and hard-working farmers, workers and artisans.
1849 Brisbane School of Arts established
1849 William Pettigrew arrives in colony. He later becomes the mayor of Brisbane in 1870 and is a member of the Legislative Assembly of Queensland between 1877 and 1894.
1850 Areas beyond inner Brisbane suburbs, such as Bulimba, Coorparoo, Enoggera, Nundah, Sherwood and Stafford are used for agriculture and grazing until the 1880s
1850 Displaced aborigines from Bribie Island, Redcliffe peninsula and Wide Bay make gunyah camps in Breakfast Creek/Eagle Farm region (until the 1860s)
1850 Arthur Lyon sends sample of cotton from New Farm to The Great Exhibition in London
1851 Influenza epidemic hits Brisbane (lasting in 1852)
1855 Nearly 1000 German migrants arrive in Brisbane after political unrest and the introduction of compulsory military training; most settle in the Nundah area
1855 (5 January) Aboriginal resistance leader Dundalli hanged near current Post Office; large-scale protests by indigenous tribes
1855 (21 February) Walter Hill appointed first superintendent of the Botanic Gardens at Brisbane.
1862 Old Government House is completed
1864 Great Fire of Brisbane
1866 11 September, food riots that were instigated by the recently retrenched workers
1867 Parliament House opens
1885 Undue Subdivision of Land Prevention Act 1885
1885 Horse-drawn tram system commences operation
 1893 Brisbane flood
1896 Capsize of the ferry Pearl
1897 Electric trams introduced
1899 Queensland Museum leaves the Old State Library Building to move into Exhibition Hall (later called the Old Museum), at Gregory Terrace, Bowen Hills

20th century

1901 Celebrations held to mark Federation, on New Year's Day
1901 Fire alarms and pillar hydrants introduced to Brisbane city streets
1902 Central Railway Station in Ann Street, Brisbane completed
1902 Brisbane officially designated city status by the Government of Queensland
1909 Government House opens at Bardon
1909 University of Queensland opens near Parliament House
1912 Brisbane General Strike
1917 Conscription disturbance at the Brisbane School of Arts
1917 Raid on the Queensland Government Printing Office
1919 Red Flag riots
1922 Queensland Government purchases privately owned tram system and establishes the Brisbane Tramways Trust
1924 Assassination of Albert Whitford
1925 Amalgamation of 25 local government areas to form the City of Greater Brisbane
1925 Queensland Government transfers responsibility for the tram system from the Brisbane Tramways Trust to the Brisbane City Council.
1927 Lone Pine Koala Sanctuary founded
1928 Sir Charles Kingsford Smith lands in Brisbane, from San Francisco, United States, after the first flight across the Pacific Ocean
1930 Shrine of Remembrance opened
1930 Brisbane City Hall opened
1939 Forgan Smith building completed at the St. Lucia campus of the University of Queensland. (Forgan Smith building was named after the, then, Premier of Queensland)
1940 Story Bridge completed
1942 General Douglas MacArthur arrives in Brisbane and takes offices in the AMP building (later called MacArthur Central) for the Pacific campaign during World War II
1942 Battle of Brisbane
1946 Following a delay caused by World War II the University of Queensland began its move from George Street, Brisbane, to its St Lucia campus, which it completed in 1972
1955 Wickham Terrace attack
1962 Paddington tram depot fire
1964 Adoption of first Brisbane Town Plan
1965 Queensland Institute of Technology (later Queensland University of Technology) established
1968 Brisbane City Council announces conversion of tram and trolley-bus systems to all-bus operations
1969 Tram and trolley bus systems close, new Victoria Bridge opened
1973 Whiskey Au Go Go fire in which 15 people are killed
1974 Brisbane River flooding, the result of continual heavy rain from Cyclone Wanda, causes major damage across city
1974 Corinda landslip
1979 Demolition of the Bellevue Hotel
1982 Commonwealth Games
1984 Queensland Performing Arts Centre opened at the Queensland Cultural Centre
1986 Queensland Museum moves to the Queensland Cultural Centre
1986 Tennyson and Bulimba coal-fired power station closed down
1986 Gateway Bridge completed
1988 State Library of Queensland leaves the old State Library Building to move to the Queensland Cultural Centre
1988 World Expo 88 held at reclaimed industrial land at South Brisbane
1989 Queensland Institute of Technology changed status to Queensland University of Technology.
1995 Treasury Casino opens

21st century

2001 Commonwealth Heads of Government Meeting (CHOGM) was scheduled for Brisbane, but postponed after heightened security concerns resulting from terrorist attacks on New York City. Instead it was held in Coolum in early 2002.
2001 Goodwill Games Opening ceremony included performances from Traditional Owners – Nunukul Yuggera Aboriginal Dancers, The Corrs, Keith Urban.
2011 Brisbane River flooding
2013 Brisbane City Hall reopened after three-year restoration
2014 2014 Brisbane hailstorm
2014 2014 Australian counter-terrorism raids
2014 Host city of the 9th G-20 Summit – Opening Ceremony included performances from Nunukul Yuggera Aboriginal Dancers and Bangurra Dance Theatre.
2021 Brisbane selected as host city of the 2032 Summer Olympics.

See also
 History of Brisbane

References

History of Brisbane
 
Brisbane
Queensland timelines